Apocopis is a genus of Asian plants in the grass family, widespread in China, the Indian Subcontinent, and Southeast Asia, including several species endemic to Myanmar (Burma).

 Species

 Formerly included
see Dichanthium Lophopogon 
 Apocopis pallida - Dichanthium caricosum 
 Apocopis tridentata - Lophopogon tridentatus

See also
 List of Poaceae genera

References

Andropogoneae
Poaceae genera
Taxa named by Christian Gottfried Daniel Nees von Esenbeck